Heliocheilus multiradiata is a species of moth of the family Noctuidae first described by George Hampson in 1902. It is found in Africa, including South Africa and Zimbabwe.

References

External links 
 
 

Heliocheilus
Moths of Africa
Moths described in 1902